Vadim (Cyrillic: Вадим) is a Russian, Ukrainian, Romanian, Slovene  masculine given name derived either from the Persian badian (anise or aniseed), or from the Ruthenian word volod, meaning to rule or vaditi, meaning to blame. Its long version, Vadimir, is now obsolete. This given name is highly popular in Russia (as Vadim), Ukraine (as Vadym), Belarus (as Vadzim), Moldova, and Slovenia.

Given name
Bademus or Vadim (died 376), Persian martyr and saint widely venerated in the Eastern Orthodox Church
Vadim the Bold legendary chieftain
Vadim Abdrashitov (born 1945), Russian film director
Vadim Alekseyev (born 1970), Soviet-Israeli swimmer
Vadim Antonov (born 1965), Russian-American software engineer and entrepreneur
Vadim Bakatin (born 1937), former Soviet politician
Vadim Belyaev, Russian banker
Vadim Boreț (born 1976), Moldovan football manager and former player
Vadim Cemîrtan (born 1987), Moldovan footballer
Vadim Cobîlaș (born 1983), Moldovan rugby union player
Vadim Crîcimari (born 1988), Moldovan footballer
Vadim Devyatovskiy (born 1977), Belarusian hammer thrower
Vadim Evseev (born 1976), Russian soccer player
Vadim Gutzeit (born 1971), Ukrainian Olympic champion sabre fencer
Vadim Jean (born 1963), British film director
Vadim Khamuttskikh (born 1969), Russian volleyball player
Vadim Khomitsky (born 1982), Russian ice hockey player
Vadim Krasnoselsky (born 1970), Transnistrian politician
Vadim Krasnoslobodtsev (born 1983), Kazakhstani ice hockey player
Vadim Mogilnitsky (1935–2012), Russian mathematics teacher, musicologist, translator and poet
Vadim Muntagirov (born 1990), Russian ballet dancer, principal dancer of The Royal Ballet in London
Vadim Perelman (born 19663), Russo-American director and producer
Vadim Petrov (1932–2020), Czech music educator
Vadim Pirogan (1921–2007), Bessarabian activist and author
Vadim Rață (born 1993), Moldovan footballer
Vadim Repin (born 1971), Russian violinist
Vadim Sashurin (born 1970), Belarusian biathlete
Vadim Shipachyov (born 1987), Russian ice hockey player
Vadim Tikunov (1921–1980), Soviet politician
Vadim Tudor (1949–2015), Romanian politician
Vadims Vasiļevskis (born 1982), Latvian athlete
Vadim Yefremovich (1903–1989), Soviet mathematician
Vadim Yusov (1929–2013), Soviet and Russian cinematographer
Vadim Shishimarin (born 2000), Russian war criminal

Surname
Christian Vadim (born 1963), French actor, son of Roger
David Vadim (born 1972), Russian actor
Nathalie Vadim (born 1958), French film director, daughter of Roger and sister of Christian
Roger Vadim (1928–2000), French screenwriter, film director and producer

References

See also
Dalailama vadim, a moth

Russian masculine given names
Ukrainian masculine given names
Belarusian masculine given names
Bulgarian masculine given names
Romanian masculine given names
Slovene masculine given names
Macedonian masculine given names